Nicolás de Ramos y Santos (1531 – December 1, 1599) was a Roman Catholic prelate who served as the Archbishop of Santo Domingo (1592–1599) and the third Bishop of Puerto Rico (1588–1592).

Biography
Nicolás de Ramos y Santos was born in Villasabariego, Spain and ordained a priest in the Order of Friars Minor. On February 12, 1588, he was appointed by the King of Spain and confirmed by Pope Sixtus V as Bishop of Puerto Rico. On July 13, 1592, he was appointed by the King of Spain and confirmed by Pope Clement VIII as Archbishop of Santo Domingo where served until his death on December 1, 1599.

References

External links and additional sources
 (for Chronology of Bishops) 
 (for Chronology of Bishops) 
 (for Chronology of Bishops) 
 (for Chronology of Bishops) 

1531 births
1599 deaths
Bishops appointed by Pope Sixtus V
Bishops appointed by Pope Clement VIII
Franciscan bishops
Spanish Friars Minor
People from the Province of León
Roman Catholic archbishops of Santo Domingo
16th-century Roman Catholic archbishops in the Dominican Republic
16th-century Roman Catholic bishops in Puerto Rico
Roman Catholic bishops of Puerto Rico